Camp Mini-Yo-We is a Christian camping and outdoor center founded on January 28, 1947. It is located in the district of Muskoka in Central Ontario, Canada. The name Mini-Yo-We means "spring" or "fountain of living water" in the Dakota Sioux language. The Camp provides outdoor programs for young people from 5 to 18 years old. Camp Mini-Yo-We focuses on leadership development and spiritual growth of young boys and girls. Rich Birch, a long time ministry leader, is the camp Executive director.

History 

Camp Mini-Yo-We has more than 70 years of history.     Sunday school teachers and superintendents from various Brethren churches in Toronto wanted a place for children to escape from the city, experience nature, and receive religious teachings. The first camps were held in 1946 using rented facilities from the Fair Havens Bible Conference in Beaverton, Ontario.

Originally, the Camp was named  The Fountain of Living Waters after the Bible verse John 4:14. Its success prompted the committee to seek land for a permanent summer camp. In 1946, the Brethren Assemblies purchased a property on Mary Lake in Muskoka. On January 28, 1947, the organization was officially incorporated and its name changed to Camp Mini-Yo-We.

In Camp Mini-Yo-We's early years, boys attended in July and girls in August. This gender separation camp would continue until 1992 when "parallel camping" was introduced. Over 10 years, there have been many construction initiatives at South Camp, including the first aid centre (1949), lodge (1951), staff house (1956), gatehouse (1958), and waterfront (1960). By 1960, the Camp was organizing programs for more than 750 children each summer.

The District of Muskoka in Huntsville, Ontario, awarded a prize to Camp Mini-Yo-We in recognition to its exceptional partnership and leadership in providing a camp experience to children.

Programs 

Camp Mini-Yo-We operates many programs at three camp sites organized around gender and age groups: Girls Camp (South Camp, for ages 10 to 15), Discovery Camp  (Chemawa, for ages 5 to 9), Boys Camp (Edgewoods, for ages 10 to 15), Enterprise (ages 14 to 15),  Leaders in Training (LIT, 14-17), and Day Camps (ages 5 to 12).  A camp site includes a lodge and is made up different sections of cabins separated by age group. More specialized programs for older age groups aim to teach campers specific skills. For example, the LIT program aims to teach teenagers how to handle house chores, survival skills, and what a role model is.   Campers engage in communal, sports and recreational activities, games, instructional periods, and Bible studies. Camp Mini-Yo-We can accommodate at most 400 campers per week and focuses on their physical, mental and spiritual development.

See also
Camping (recreational activity)
Outdoor education
Prayer camps

References

Further reading

Scouting events
Summer camps in Canada
Buildings and structures in the District Municipality of Muskoka
Organizations established in 1947
1947 establishments in Ontario